Fuquay Springs Teacherage is a historic teacherage located at Fuquay-Varina, Wake County, North Carolina.  It was built about 1925, as a Bungalow / American Craftsman style residence. It was more than doubled in size in 1947, when the Wake County Board of Education purchased the property for use as a teacherage.  It is a two-story, red brick building with a low hipped roof and wide eaves.  It features a full width, hip roofed front porch on the original section.

It was listed on the National Register of Historic Places in 2002.

References

Residential buildings on the National Register of Historic Places in North Carolina
Residential buildings completed in 1947
Buildings and structures in Wake County, North Carolina
National Register of Historic Places in Wake County, North Carolina
Teacherages